Santiago Domingo Lucas (born December 20, 1966, in Norzagaray, Bulacan), known professionally as Pretty Boy Lucas  is a retired Filipino professional boxer who competed from 1983 to 1995, challenging for the world title to four times in the 1980s and the 1990s but not successful.

Pugilistic career
Lucas went pro in late 1983 include won the Philippines mini flyweight (105 lbs) champion. He had the opportunity to challenge for the vacant IBF mini flyweight world title against Thai boxer Samuth Sithnaruepol on March 24, 1988, at Rajadamnern Stadium, Bangkok.

Undefeated Lucas, who wore navy blue trunks with white diagonal bar, fought well and can punch the right fist to the opponent's chin until staggers in the first round. Unfortunately, in the 11th round, he was beaten by  Sithnaruepol's fist as a result, his right eyebrow seriously bleed. The bout had to end when the doctor didn't allow him to continue fighting and made him lose. Although Thai boxer was the victor and became the new champion, the spectators shouted  "Khi khong Khi khong Khi khong" (literally: "cheating cheating cheating") to express their dissatisfaction with the decision.

Two years later, he returned to Thailand to challenge the world title in the same weight class and same organization with the new champion Fahlan Lukmingkwan on December 20, 1990, Lucas's 24th birthday. The result was draw.

On March 16, 1992, Lucas had the opportunity to challenge the world title for the third time with Ricardo López the unbeaten Mexican champion in Mexico City. He was the unanimous loser.

Subsequently, he promoted to the flyweight (112 lbs) to challenge the WBO world title with South Africa's Jacob Matlala on October 15, 1994. Lacus was the unanimous loser again.

His last bout took place on February 20, 1995, in Tokyo, Japan when losing by technical knockout in the 10th round to Chang Jae Kwon from South Korea. He was so injured in the fight that he had to undergo two brain surgeries, therefore had to retire by default. Pretty Boy Lucas record for 43 fights is 34 wins (10 on knockouts), 7 losses (2 on knockouts), and 2 draws.

References

External links

Mini-flyweight boxers
Light-flyweight boxers
Flyweight boxers
1966 births
Living people
Sportspeople from Bulacan
Filipino male boxers